United Nations Security Council resolution 1347, adopted unanimously on 30 March 2001, after recalling resolutions   955 (1994), 1165 (1998) and 1329 (2000), the Council forwarded a list of nominees for permanent judges at the International Criminal Tribunal for Rwanda (ICTR) to the General Assembly for consideration.

The list of nominees proposed by the Secretary-General Kofi Annan was as follows:

 Mouinou Aminou (Benin)
 Frederick Mwela Chomba (Zambia)
 Winston Churchill Matanzima Maqutu (Lesotho)
 Harris Michael Mtegha (Malawi)
 Arlette Ramaroson (Madagascar)

In April 2001, Arlette Ramaroson and Winston Churchill Matanzima Maqutu were elected to serve at the ICTR by the General Assembly until their terms expired on 24 May 2003.

See also
 List of United Nations Security Council Resolutions 1301 to 1400 (2000–2002)
 Rwandan genocide

References

External links
 
Text of the Resolution at undocs.org

 1347
2001 in Rwanda
 1347
March 2001 events